Spider is a balloon-borne experiment designed to search for primordial gravitational waves imprinted on the cosmic microwave background (CMB).  Measuring the strength of this signal puts limits on inflationary theory.

The Spider instrument consists of six degree-resolution telescopes cooled to liquid Helium temperature (4 K) which observe at frequencies of 100 GHz, 150 GHz, and 280 GHz (corresponding to wavelengths of 3 mm, 2 mm, and 1.1 mm).  Each telescope is coupled to a polarisation-sensitive transition-edge bolometer (TES) array cooled to 300 mK.  Spider was the first instrument to successfully demonstrate time-domain multiplexed TES detectors in a space-like environment.  At the time of the first flight over Antarctica in 2015, Spider was the most sensitive microwave instrument ever made.

The primary science goals include:
 characterization of the curl-free component of the CMB polarization on the largest scales
 searching for the signature of inflationary gravitational waves in the CMB polarization
 characterization of the polarization properties of the emission from our own Milky Way Galaxy

The first balloon flight of the experiment launched in January 2015 from McMurdo Station, Antarctica, with support from NASA's Columbia Scientific Balloon Facility.  This Long Duration Balloon flight lasted for about 17 days, mapping about 10% of the full sky.  The data from this flight produced high signal-to-noise images of the intensity and linear polarization of the Cosmic Microwave Background, with noise levels 3--5 times lower than the Planck spacecraft in the same region of the sky, resulting in precise measurements of the CMB and Galactic foreground radiation, as well as a robust limit on the cosmological tensor-to-scalar ratio. Further flights planned for successive seasons enable upgrades and changes to the modular telescope, increased frequency coverage and depth.

References

External links
 Group Research Homepage
 Spider Homepage
 Spider 2014/15 campaign blog
 The Spider Collaboration, "A Constraint on Primordial B-Modes from the First Flight of the SPIDER Balloon-Borne Telescope"

See also

BICEP and Keck Array
Cosmology Large Angular Scale Surveyor
Atacama Cosmology Telescope
South Pole Telescope
POLARBEAR
LiteBIRD, space-based CMB B-mode polarization search project

Astronomical instruments
Balloon-borne telescopes
Cosmic microwave background experiments